The FIL European Luge Championships 1937 took place in February 1937 at Korketrekkeren in Oslo, Norway under the auspices of the Fédération Internationale de Bobsleigh et de Tobogganing (FIBT - International Bobsleigh and Tobogganing Federation in ) under their "Section de Luge", a trend that would continue until the International Luge Federation (FIL) was formed in 1957.

Men's singles

Women's singles

Men's doubles

Medal table

References

Men's doubles European champions 
Men's singles European champions 
Women's singles European champions 
Medals 1937
Men's results 1937
Women's results 1937

FIL European Luge Championships
International sports competitions in Oslo
1937 in luge
1937 in Norwegian sport
Luge in Norway
Sledding in Norway
February 1937 sports events
1930s in Oslo